The Governor Stephen Hopkins House is a museum and National Historic Landmark at 15 Hopkins Street in Providence, Rhode Island.  The house was the home of Stephen Hopkins—a governor of Rhode Island and signatory of the Declaration of Independence—as well at least six of his slaves.

Description

The Stephen Hopkins House is an L-shaped, 2½-story, wood-framed structure whose main block was built in 1742–43 for Hopkins, with an attached two-story ell whose first floor dates to 1707. The main block is four bays wide and two deep, with the main entrance in the second bay from the left. This entry is a 20th-century alteration; the original main entrance was through a doorway on the west side of the ell.

The interior of the main block has the main parlor on the right and Governor Hopkins' study on the left, flanking a central hallway with stair. Behind the parlor is a keeping room, with a small bedchamber behind the study. There are five bedrooms on the second floor, two with fireplaces. The downstairs fireplace mantels are paneled, with the one in the parlor slightly more elaborate.

History
The 1707 house was purchased by Stephen Hopkins in 1742 and enlarged into its present size. It served as his home until his death in 1785. During these years, he served in the colonial assembly, as a justice (first associate, then chief) of the colonial high court, and as governor of the Colony of Rhode Island from 1755 to 1757. The house is the only significant structure associated with Hopkins' life.

George Washington visited the house on April 5, 1776, while traveling through Providence on his way to take command of the Continental Army in Boston. Washington was entertained by Hopkins' daughter, as Hopkins was in Philadelphia attending the Continental Congress at the time.

In 2011, a room on the building's second floor, above the kitchen was tentatively identified as the living quarters of Hopkin's slaves.

The house was originally built on the northeast corner of South Main Street (formerly Towne Street) and Hopkins Street (formerly Bank Lane). In 1809 the house was moved halfway up the north side of Hopkins Street. It was moved again in 1928 to its present location on Hopkins Street.

In the late 1920s, the house was carefully restored by Norman Isham. It is now owned by The National Society of the Colonial Dames of America and managed by their local state chapter, as is standard for most NSCDA properties. It was open to the public as a museum prior to March 2020 but there are no known plans to reopen it. It was listed on the National Register of Historic Places in 1970, and declared a National Historic Landmark in 1978.

Gallery

See also

List of National Historic Landmarks in Rhode Island
National Register of Historic Places in Providence, Rhode Island

References

External links

Colonial Dames site

Houses completed in 1708
National Historic Landmarks in Rhode Island
Hopkins, Stephen
Museums in Providence, Rhode Island
Hopkins
Houses on the National Register of Historic Places in Rhode Island
Houses in Providence, Rhode Island
National Society of the Colonial Dames of America
National Register of Historic Places in Providence, Rhode Island
Historic district contributing properties in Rhode Island
1708 establishments in Rhode Island
Governor of Rhode Island
Homes of United States Founding Fathers